Pakshikere is a hamlet on Haleyangady to Kinnigoli route. This hamlet is situated in Mangalore taluk of Dakshina Kannada district of Karnataka, India. Pakshikere in Kannada literally means bird's lake or lake of birds. Pakshi means bird and kere means lake. Here in Pakshikere you can find few of the famous religious centers, like Suragiri Temple, Jarandaya Banta Sthana, Badriya Jumma Masjid, St Jude Church and Shrine founded in the year 1960 by Rev.Fr. Jacob Lobo., and few other sthanas.

Nearby places 
 Mangalore
 Kateel
 Kinnigoli
 Attur-kemral
 Mulki
 Punaroor
 Hosakadu 
 Thokur
 Damaskatte
 S. Kodi (Shinapai Kodi)

Localities in Mangalore
Villages in Dakshina Kannada district